Agnes Muir was an iron full-rigged ship built in 1869 by Robert Duncan & Co at Port Glasgow.

She was launched on 13 March 1869, built for  James Galbraith and partners, Glasgow.

On 27 July 1874 she was sold to Killick Martin & Company, and was initially placed under the command of Captain Evan Lloud. Later that year however the captaincy changed to James Lowe, who remained with her until she was sold by Killick Martin & Company in 1885.

On 19 May 1885 Killick Martin & Company Sold Agnes Muir to E. Tobias in Germany and she was renamed Adele.

She was subsequently sold in 1899 to Lübken, Elsfleth, and again in 1993 to Aktieselskabet Adele (E.M. Olsen), Tønsberg, Norway.

References

External links
 Galbraiths  
 Killick Martin & Company

Individual sailing vessels
Victorian-era merchant ships of the United Kingdom
Ships built in Glasgow